Mehmet Tahir (1864–1909), also known as Ibn Hakkı Mehmet Tahir, Baba Tahir, Malumatçı Tahir, was an Ottoman period publisher who was one of the significant figures in the Ottoman journalism. He published numerous periodicals and newspapers, including Malumat and Hanımlara Mahsus Gazete. He is also known for his criminal offenses.

Biography
Mehmet Tahir was born in 1864. He owned a publishing house in Istanbul where he published many periodicals and newspapers.

Mehmet Tahir had close connections with Sultan Abdulhamit. In 1898 he was awarded a medal by the Sultan and given a higher imperial rank, rütbe. In addition, he was also appointed clerk at the palace.

He published newspapers in Egypt which featured articles opposing the Ottomans. These publications were, in fact, fabricated by him to blame the Young Turks and to create further tensions between Sultan Abdulhamit and the group. In 1900 another conflict occurred because of the news published in his papers Malumat and Servet. The papers accused the Dutch colonial rule of being hostile to the Muslims living in the Dutch East Indies, including Java. Upon these news the Dutch ambassador Wilhelm Ferdinand Heinrich von Weckherlin sent a note to the Sultan demanding the cancellation of these publications. The request of the Dutch was followed for a while, but the news continued from 1901. Mehmet Tahir's another improper journalistic activities were the publication of his newspapers without paying the tax stamps and the licences. He also involved in the illegal patent business and sold them to Europeans. Although he was not punished for these illegal operations for a while in 1907 he was arrested and sent to exile in Tripoli. Next year he could return to Istanbul following the constitutional revolution.

Mehmet Tahir was married to Fatma Şadiye Hanım who was among the contributors of Hanımlara Mahsus Gazete. He died in Istanbul in 1909.

References

19th-century journalists
19th-century newspaper publishers (people)
19th-century people from the Ottoman Empire
1864 births
1909 deaths
Turkish newspaper editors
Businesspeople from Istanbul
Turkish expatriates in Libya